The Glorieta Baldy Lookout Tower, in Santa Fe National Forest near La Cueva, Santa Fe County, New Mexico, was built in 1940.  It was listed on the National Register of Historic Places in 1988.

References

Fire lookout towers on the National Register of Historic Places in New Mexico
National Register of Historic Places in San Miguel County, New Mexico
Buildings and structures completed in 1940